The PMPC Star Award for Best Talent Search Program is given to the best talent search programs of the year and also talent search program hosts since 2004 (formerly known as "Best Talent Show & Host since 1987-89).

Winners

Total of number of awardees

 Luis Manzano - 11 awards (shared)
 Billy Crawford - 4 awards (3 shared & 1 solo)
 Alex Gonzaga - 2 awards (shared)
 Robi Domingo - 2 awards (shared)
 Jolina Magdangal - 2 awards (1 shared & 1 solo)
 Jodi Sta. Maria - 2 awards (shared)

Notes

 Showtime was changed category as "Best Reality & Game Show" in 2012, "Best Variety Show" in 2013 & 2014 as It's Showtime! and "Best Musical Variety Show" in 2015 to present.
 Luis Manzano have 2 nominations & 11 won awards (need more 4 awards will be the next PMPC Star Awards for TV's Hall of Fame).

PMPC Star Awards for Television